The Center on Media and Child Health (CMCH) is a non-profit organization based at Boston Children's Hospital. CMCH was founded in 2002, by Michael Rich, pediatrician; Associate Professor of Pediatrics at Harvard Medical School;  and Associate Professor of Society, Human Development, and Health at Harvard T.H. Chan School of Public Health.

Mission
CMCH conducts scientific research to improve the understanding of media influence and provide evidence-based expertise to initiatives and programs that address children's involvement with media.

Research

CMCH researchers investigate correlations between media use and children's physical and mental health outcomes, measuring media exposure in youth. Combining techniques of momentary sampling and video capture, this method is more sensitive to the variety of media used, more responsive to media multitasking, and more accurate in its capture of both media content and usage time.

CMCH researchers have developed the Video Intervention/Prevention Assessment (VIA) method, a  research method that allows children and teen patients the opportunity to create video diaries about living with an illness. These videos can be used to teach physicians more about the realities of various conditions. CMCH maintains a database of scientific studies on how media affects children's health. David Bickham has researched the role of television viewing and social isolation. CMCH has also been involved in research which addresses the media education of pediatric residents.

References

External links 
 Center on Media and Child Health Official Website
 Ask the Mediatrician
 CMCH Database of Research
 Video Intervention/Prevention Assessment(VIA)

Non-profit organizations based in Boston
Children's health-related organizations
Communications and media organizations based in the United States
Children's mass media
Advertising organizations
Organizations established in 2002
2002 establishments in Massachusetts